Cartvale Football Club was a shortlived football football club from Busby, East Renfrewshire that existed from 1878 until 1890. The club regularly competed in the Scottish Cup and reached the semi-finals in 1882.

History
The club was founded in 1878, originally playing at Overlee Park, moving to Cartsbridge Park by 1879.  Its first entry into the Scottish Cup was in 1878–79, ending in defeat to Arthurlie F.C. in the first round.

The club's best run in the competition came in 1881–82, thanks in part to an unusual occurrence.  The club beat Renfrew in the first round, but, thanks to a clerical error, was omitted from the second round draw, and had to be given a bye.

The club reaped the benefits of the bye, as it went on its best-ever Cup run, reaching the semi-finals.  However the club was overmatched against Dumbarton F.C., conceding a goal in the second minute, turning around at half-time 5–1 in arrears, and ultimately losing 11–2.

Cartvale had some consolation in the Renfrewshire Cup in the same season, as it reached the final for the only time in its history.  The game was played at Blackstoun Park in Paisley, the home ground of Abercorn F.C., with Arthurlie as opponent.  Cartvale was unlucky to lose the toss, as Arthurlie chose to play with the wind at their backs in the first half, and the wind had dropped for the second; Arthurlie took the trophy with a 2–0 win.

The club reached the final 8 in 1883–84, beating three other Renfrewshire sides, but when drawn to meet Queen's Park F.C. at Titwood in the quarter-finals the club again found the step up too difficult, losing 6–1 after conceding four in the second half.

The club's last entry to the national competition was in 1886–87, losing 6–2 at Johnstone.  In 1887, the club changed its name to Busby, which had been the name of an earlier club which had existed from 1873 to 1880.  The club seems to have wound up by 1890, as its last entry to the Renfrewshire Cup was in 1889–90.  Drawn at home to St Mirren F.C. in the second round, Busby took the lead, but lost 11–2.  By this time the club was not considered on the same level as the senior clubs it had previously played on an even basis, with Abercorn sending a reserve side to play Busby at the start of the season.

Colours
The club's colours were as follows:

Notable players
Robert Calderwood, capped three times for Scotland while with the club
Michael Dunbar, capped once for Scotland while with the club, scoring in the international against Ireland in 1886
Tom Dunbar, who later played for both Old Firm clubs
John Kelly, goalkeeper, who moved to Celtic F.C. in time to play in the 1889 Scottish Cup Final
J. E. McKillop, referee for the 1886 Scottish Cup Final

References

External links
Scottish Football Club Directory
RSSSF: Scottish Cup

Defunct football clubs in Scotland
Association football clubs established in 1878
Association football clubs disestablished in 1890
1878 establishments in Scotland
1890 disestablishments in Scotland
Football in East Renfrewshire